Çaybaşı is a village in the Kâhta District, Adıyaman Province, Turkey. The village is populated by Kurds of the Bezikan tribe and had a population of 388 in 2021.

The hamlets of Akbal, Bulutlu, Duman and Kamışlı are attached to the village.

References

Villages in Kâhta District
Kurdish settlements in Adıyaman Province